Reckless may refer to:

Film and television

Film
 Reckless (1935 film), an American musical directed by Victor Fleming
 Reckless (1951 film), a Spanish drama film directed by José Antonio Nieves Conde
 The Reckless, a 1965 Italian drama film directed by Giuliano Montaldo
 Reckless (1984 film), an American romantic drama directed by James Foley
 Reckless (1995 film), an adaptation of the play by Craig Lucas (see below), directed by Norman René
 Reckless (2014 film), a Dutch film directed by Joram Lürsen
 Reckless (2018 film), an Italian comedy film directed by Marco Ponti

Television 
 Reckless (TV serial), a 1997 British drama serial
 Reckless (TV series), a 2014 American legal drama series
 "Reckless" (Combat Hospital), an episode
 "Reckless" (Holby City), an episode
 "Reckless" (The Flash), an episode
 "Reckless" (The Ranch), an episode

Literature
 Reckless, a 1983 play by Craig Lucas
 Reckless (von Ziegesar novel), a 2006 young adult novel by Cecily von Ziegesar
 Reckless (Funke novel), a 2010 young adult novel by Cornelia Funke
 Reckless (Gross novel), a 2010 novel by Andrew Gross
 Reckless: My Life as a Pretender, a 2015 memoir by Chrissie Hynde

Music

Albums
 Reckless (The Sports album) or the title song, 1978
 Reckless (Bryan Adams album) or the title song, 1984
 Reckless (Luther Allison album), 1997
 Reckless: 1979–1995, by Australian Crawl, 2000
 Reckless (Special D. album) or the title song, 2004
 Reckless (SteelDrivers album), 2010
 Reckless (Jeremy Camp album) or the title song, 2013
 Reckless (Martina McBride album) or the title song, 2016
 Reckless (Nav album) or the title song, 2018

Songs
 "Reckless", from the film Reckless, 1935
 "Reckless", by Sammy Hagar from Musical Chairs, 1977
 "Reckless" (Australian Crawl song), 1983
 "Reckless" (Chris "The Glove" Taylor & David Storrs song), featuring Ice-T, 1984
 "Reckless", by Judas Priest from Turbo, 1986
 "Reckless", by Afrika Bambaataa from The Light, 1988
 "Reckless" (Alabama song), 1993
 "Reckless", by Papa Roach from The Paramour Sessions, 2006
 "Reckless" (Tilly and the Wall song), 2006
 "Reckless", by Crystal Castles from Crystal Castles, 2008
 "Reckless", by J, 2008
 "Reckless" (Jeremy Camp song), 2012
 "Reckless", by You Me at Six from Sinners Never Sleep, 2012
 "Reckless", by Atreyu from Long Live, 2015
 "Reckless", by Anastacia from Evolution, 2017
 "Reckless", by Lacuna Coil from Black Anima, 2019
 "Reckless", by J Hus from Big Conspiracy, 2020
 "Reckless", by Wizkid from Made in Lagos, 2020
 "Reckless" (Madison Beer song), 2021
 "Reckless", by Young Stoner Life from Slime Language 2, 2021

Other uses
 Battle of Hollandia, code name Operation Reckless, a World War II battle in northern New Guinea
 Reckless (surname)
 Sergeant Reckless (c. 1948–1968), a war horse that held official rank in the United States military
 Nikola Reckless, a proposed electric tactical military vehicle

See also

 Charles the Bold (1433–1477), Duke of Burgundy, also translated as Charles the Reckless
 Reck (disambiguation)
 Recklessness (disambiguation)
 Wreckless (disambiguation)